The Blue Squadron is a 1937  Argentine film directed and written by Nelo Cosimi. The film was released in the United States on 3 June 1938 by the Cinexport Distributing Co.

Cast
Domingo Sapelli
María Esther Podestá
Sara Watle
Samuel Sanda
Adolfo Almeida
Raúl Castro
Amalia Brian
Max Citelli
Herminia Mancini
Ángle Reyes
Rafael Salvatore
Alberto Terrones
Yola Yoli

References

External links

1937 films
1930s Spanish-language films
Argentine black-and-white films
1930s Argentine films